Cardoreovirus is a genus of double-stranded RNA viruses in the family Reoviridae and subfamily Sedoreovirinae. Crabs serve as natural hosts. There is only one species in this genus: Eriocheir sinensis reovirus. Diseases associated with this genus include: trembling disease. The name derives from Latin words "carcinus" which means crab and "doeca" which means twelve in reference to the number genome segments.

Structure
Viruses in the genus Cardoreovirus are non-enveloped. They have an icosahedral capsid that is three-layered. The inner shell has T=2 symmetry and the middle shell has T=13 symmetry. The diameter is around 55 nm.

Genome 
The genome is made of double-stranded RNA. It is linear and has twelve segments.

Life cycle
Viral replication is cytoplasmic. Entry into the host cell is achieved by attachment to host receptors, which mediates endocytosis. Replication follows the double-stranded RNA virus replication model. Double-stranded RNA virus transcription is the method of transcription. The virus exits the host cell by monopartite non-tubule guided viral movement. Crabs serve as the natural host. Transmission routes are passive diffusion.

Taxonomy
The genus contains one species: 

Eriocheir sinensis reovirus

References

External links
 Viralzone: Cardoreovirus
 ICTV

Reoviruses
Virus genera